The following Union Army units and commanders fought in the Battle of Antietam of the American Civil War. The Confederate order of battle is listed separately. Order of battle compiled from the army organization during the Maryland Campaign, the casualty returns and the reports.

Abbreviations used

Military rank
 MG = Major General
 BG = Brigadier General
 Col = Colonel
 Ltc = Lieutenant Colonel
 Maj = Major
 Cpt = Captain
 Lt = Lieutenant

Other
 w = wounded
 mw = mortally wounded
 k = killed in action
 c = captured

Army of the Potomac

MG George McClellan

General Staff and Headquarters

General Staff
 Chief of Staff: BG Randolph B. Marcy
 Assistant Adjutant General: BG Seth Williams
 Inspector General: BG Delos B. Sackett
 Chief of Artillery: BG Henry J. Hunt
 Chief Quartermaster: Ltc Rufus Ingalls

General Headquarters

Escort: Cpt James B. McIntyre
 Independent Company Oneida (New York) Cavalry: Cpt Daniel P. Mann
 4th United States Cavalry, Company A: Lt Thomas H. McCormick
 4th United States Cavalry, Company E: Cpt James B. McIntyre

U.S. Engineer Battalion: Cpt James C. Duane

Provost Guard: Maj William H. Wood
 2nd United States Cavalry, Companies E, F, H, and K: Cpt George A. Gordon
 8th United States, Companies A, D, F, and G: Cpt Royal T. Frank
 19th United States, Company G: Cpt Edmund L. Smith
 19th United States, Company H: Cpt Henry S. Welton

Headquarters Guard: Maj Granville O. Haller
 93rd New York: Ltc Benjamin C. Butler

Quartermaster's Guard: 
 1st United States Cavalry, Companies B, C, H, and I: Cpt Marcus A. Reno

I Corps

MG Joseph Hooker (w)

BG George G. Meade

Escort: 
 2nd New York Cavalry, Companies A, B, I and K: Cpt John E. Naylor

II Corps

MG Edwin V. Sumner

Escort:
 6th New York Cavalry, Company D: Cpt Henry W. Lyon
 6th New York Cavalry, Company K: Cpt Riley Johnson

IV Corps

V Corps

MG Fitz John Porter

Escort:
 1st Maine Cavalry (detachment): Cpt George J. Summat

VI Corps

MG William B. Franklin

Escort:
 6th Pennsylvania Cavalry, Companies B and G: Cpt Henry P. Muirheid

IX Corps

MG Ambrose Burnside  

BG Jacob D. Cox

Escort:
 1st Maine Cavalry, Company G: Cpt Zebulon B. Blethen

XII Corps

MG Joseph K. Mansfield (mw)

BG Alpheus S. Williams

Escort:
 1st Michigan Cavalry, Company L: Cpt Melvin Brewer

Cavalry

Notes

References
 Antietam National Battlefield
 Eicher, John H., and David J. Eicher. Civil War High Commands. Stanford, California: Stanford University Press, 2001. .

 U.S. War Department, The War of the Rebellion: a Compilation of the Official Records of the Union and Confederate Armies, U.S. Government Printing Office, 1880–1901.

American Civil War orders of battle
Order of Battle